Bishal Lama is an Indian politician from the Bharatiya Janata Party. In May 2021, he was elected as the member of the West Bengal Legislative Assembly from Kalchini.

Career
Lama is from Kalchini, Alipurduar district. His father's name is Praduman Lama. He passed B.A. at North Bengal University. He contested 2021 West Bengal Legislative Assembly election from Kalchini Vidhan Sabha and won the seat on 2 May 2021.

References

21st-century Indian politicians
Bharatiya Janata Party politicians from West Bengal
Year of birth missing (living people)
Living people
West Bengal MLAs 2021–2026
People from Alipurduar district